The Novosibirsk tramway is a transport system in Novosibirsk, Russia. It was opened on November 26, 1934. In 2011, passenger traffic of Novosibirsk tramway was 19.7 million. The total length of the tram network is 152.8 km. The network has 11 routes.

History

In June 1933, the construction of the first line began.

The opening of the first line took place on the morning of November 26, 1934.

The maximum length of the tram tracks was reached in 1987 – 191.4 km. There has been no tram connection across the Ob since 1992, when tram tracks on the Kommunalny Bridge were dismantled (there was the same situation in the period 1940-1955 before the opening of the Kommunalny Bridge).

The total number of passengers carried by the tram network has reached 11 million.

Current status

System consists of 10 routes: 6 of them are situated in left-bank part of the city (№№ 3, 8, 9, 10, 15, 18), 4 of them are situated in right-bank of the city (№№ 5, 11, 13, 14).

The tram fleet is represented by such models as Soviet KTM-5, and 71-608, Russian LM99, 71-619, and 71-623, Belarusian AKSM-60102, and AKSM-62103, Czech Tatra KT4.

Gallery

References

External links
 Что лучше: трамвай или троллейбус? Вечерний Новосибирск.
 The register of the routes of Novosibirsk city public transport (in Russian)

Transport in Novosibirsk
Tram transport in Russia